VUL may refer to:

 Vancouver Ultimate League
 Variable universal life insurance
 Vilnius University Library
 Virginia University of Lynchburg
 Vulpecula, a constellation
 PSS silent pistol, or "Vul"